The 2008 Lower Saxony state election was held on 27 January 2008 to elect the members of the 16th Landtag of Lower Saxony. The incumbent coalition government of the Christian Democratic Union (CDU) and Free Democratic Party (FDP) led by Minister-President Christian Wulff was re-elected with a reduced majority.

Campaign
Lower Saxony was seen as a stronghold of the Christian Democratic Union and their leader  Christian Wulff was seen as likely to easily defeat the Social Democrats. The election in Lower Saxony took place on the same day as the 2008 Hessian state election; Wulff was seen as a more moderate leader than Roland Koch in Hesse and consequently more likely to perform better in the election. The CDU government had held spending down, introduced tuition fees for university students, while supporting the minimum wage. The Social Democrats (SPD) led their campaign with a call for a national minimum wage for all workers. The SPD leader in Lower Saxony, Wolfgang Jüttner, was little known to voters and unusually during the campaign made an attack on Wolff for his personal life.

Parties
The table below lists parties represented in the 15th Landtag of Lower Saxony.

Opinion polling

Election result

|-
! colspan="2" | Party
! Votes
! %
! +/-
! Seats 
! +/-
! Seats %
|-
| bgcolor=| 
| align=left | Christian Democratic Union (CDU)
| align=right| 1,455,687
| align=right| 42.5
| align=right| 5.8
| align=right| 68
| align=right| 23
| align=right| 44.7
|-
| bgcolor=| 
| align=left | Social Democratic Party (SPD)
| align=right| 1,035,894
| align=right| 30.3
| align=right| 3.1
| align=right| 48
| align=right| 15
| align=right| 31.6
|-
| bgcolor=| 
| align=left | Free Democratic Party (FDP)
| align=right| 279,557
| align=right| 8.2
| align=right| 0.1
| align=right| 13
| align=right| 2
| align=right| 8.6
|-
| bgcolor=| 
| align=left | Alliance 90/The Greens (Grüne)
| align=right| 273,934
| align=right| 8.0
| align=right| 0.4
| align=right| 12
| align=right| 2
| align=right| 7.9
|-
| bgcolor=| 
| align=left | The Left (Linke)
| align=right| 243,106
| align=right| 7.1
| align=right| 6.6
| align=right| 11
| align=right| 11
| align=right| 7.2
|-
! colspan=8|
|-
| bgcolor=| 
| align=left | National Democratic Party (NPD)
| align=right| 52,817
| align=right| 1.5
| align=right| 1.5
| align=right| 0
| align=right| ±0
| align=right| 0
|-
| bgcolor=|
| align=left | Others
| align=right| 81,557
| align=right| 2.4
| align=right| 
| align=right| 0
| align=right| ±0
| align=right| 0
|-
! align=right colspan=2| Total
! align=right| 3,422,552
! align=right| 100.0
! align=right| 
! align=right| 152
! align=right| 31
! align=right| 
|-
! align=right colspan=2| Voter turnout
! align=right| 
! align=right| 57.0
! align=right| 10.0
! align=right| 
! align=right| 
! align=right| 
|}

Outcome
The results saw the Christian Democratic Union easily defeat the Social Democrats, despite suffering a drop in votes and seats. As a result, their leader Christian Wulff was seen as having strengthened his chances of succeeding national CDU leader Angela Merkel. The 30.3% of the vote that the Social Democrats won was the worst performance by the party in Lower Saxony since the Second World War, which was described as a 'disaster' for the party. Turnout in the election was 57%.

The Left entered the Landtag for the first time with 7.1% of the vote, comfortably exceeding the 5% electoral threshold. Along with the election in Hesse held on the same day in which The Left also won seats, this was the first time they had achieved representation in any large state in western Germany.

References

Lower Saxony
2008
Lower Saxony